Zoe Bergermann (born April 28, 1994) is a Canadian snowboarder, competing in the discipline of snowboard cross. She competed at the 2022 Winter Olympics, in Women's snowboard cross.

Life 
She was born in Georgetown, and grew up in Erin, Ontario, at which point she'd practice at Caledon Ski Club.

Career

Winter Olympics
In January 2018, Bergermann was named to Canada's 2018 Olympic team. She placed 23rd in the women's snowboard cross.

In January 2022, Bergermann was named to Canada's 2022 Olympic team.

References

External links
 
 
 
 
 

1994 births
Living people
Canadian female snowboarders
Snowboarders at the 2018 Winter Olympics
Snowboarders at the 2022 Winter Olympics
Olympic snowboarders of Canada